Salma Rachid ( Moroccan pronunciation: ; born 13 June 1994) is a Moroccan pop singer who gained fame at the age of 18 following her participation in the second season of Arab Idol, broadcast on MBC. The youngest contestant, she earned fifth place and was praised for the strength of her voice, her ability to master various styles, and her charisma. She was nicknamed El Sultana by her fans and considers Umm Kulthum among her main inspiration.

Early life 
Her family originally from the oasis of Tafilalt, a region south east Morocco, Salma was born and raised in the neighbourhood of Hay Mohammedi, in the Ain Sebaa-Hay Mohammedi district of Casablanca, Morocco. Salma was passionate about music, drawing and fashion from a very young age. She told MBC during an interview that she used to steal clothes from her family, tearing them apart and then stitching them to create new clothes. She also said in the same interview that she almost got hit by a car when she was younger, but her best friend saved her, losing her own life. She graduated from high school in June 2012, getting her baccalauréat and enrolled into university where she pursued her studies in economics.

Participation in Arab Idol 
At the age of 18, Salma decided to take a chance and auditioned for the second season of Arab Idol. The Moroccan audition took place in Casablanca, and Salma performed "Ya Moniyati", a Yemeni song that is extremely popular throughout the Persian Gulf region, in front of the jury panel composed by Arabic superstars Ragheb Alama, Ahlam, Nancy Ajram and Egyptian producer Hassan El Shafei. Salma was then accepted by all of them and flew to Beirut, Lebanon, to pursue the casting process.

She performed then "El Ward Gamil" from Umm Kulthum with five other contestants, than she performed "Awal Marra" by Abdelhalim Hafez and managed to be picked among the 27 finalists who would compete to get into the finale stage. During the first prime, she performed Talal Maddah's classic "Zaman El Samt", but even if the jury was convinced by her beautiful and powerful voice, her interpretation was judged too aggressive. Ahlam nevertheless said that if she just focused a bit more and doesn't get carried away in her performances, she would "break" the Arab world (as being the new Arabic musical sensation). Unfortunately, Salma didn't manage to get enough votes, and she was one of the eight contestants picked by the jury to perform in order to get one of the 4 wildcards. She was picked by Ragheb Alama and performed Umm Kulthum's "Ya Msaharni" for survival. She was eventually saved alongside Bahraini contestant Hanane Reda, which allowed her to finally be part of the thirteen finalists.

Salma performed various songs during the competition, from classic singers such as Sabah, Umm Kulthum, Mayada El Henawi, to folk singer such as Fouad Ghazi or Arabic pop singers like Samira Said or Sherine. What was remarkable about Salma's path is that even if she didn't get enough votes in the beginning, she managed to be in the safe zone most of the time, thanks to her on-growing fanbase. She was acclaimed by the jury and the audience each Friday and even Egyptian superstar  Mohammed Mounir told her  : "You have something rare in the Arab world  : a great voice with a huge charisma". She was contacted by many people from the Arabic music scene who praised her for her voice, such as Syrian singer Rouwaida Attieh and Lebanese lyricist Salim Assaf (who wrote songs for top singers like Carole Samaha, Najwa Karam, Ramy Ayach and who told her he will write her a song) as well as various people from the Moroccan scene.

On the 7th prime, she performed Ahlam's tube "Nawaylak Ala Niya", then sung with Lebanese pop singer Diana Haddad the folk song "Bayn El Assr wa El Maghreb" during a medley dedicated to the star of Bedouin music Samira Tawfik and rended the cult song "Mistaniyak" from Moroccan diva Aziza Jalal with the two other female contestants. On 8 June 2013, she was voted off with Kurdish contestant Parwas Hussein, being ranked 5th. Even if she lost the competition, she was praised by the jury as being the surprise of this edition, and as being a rare voice. According to jury member Hassan El Shafei's Twitter, Salma signed a ten-year contract with Platinum Records, the music recording label affiliated with MBC and directed by Saudi superstar Rashed Al-Majed. She will tour with Ragheb Alama in all his concerts and was chosen with Mohammed Assaf from Palestine, Ahmad Gamal from Egypt and Farah Youssef from Syria to be a part of the contestants who will tour throughout the Arab world.

Performances in Arab Idol

Performances during the auditions 
Casting (Casablanca): "Ya Monyati" by Abdelmohssen El Mohanad
Casting Beirut (Group audition): "El Ward Gamil" by Umm Kulthum
Casting Beirut (Finale audition): "Awal Marrah" by Abdelhalim Hafez

Performances during the primes 
 Top 27: "Zaman El Samt" by Talal Maddah
 Wildcards Survival Prime: "Ya Msaharni" by Umm Kulthum
 1st Prime: "Lazraalak Boustan Worood" by Fouad Ghazi
 2nd Prime: "Aal Bal" by Samira Said
 3rd Prime: "Li Sabr Hdoud" by Umm Kulthum
 4th Prime: "Zay El Aassal" by Sabah
 5th Prime: "Ana Baash'ak" by Mayada El Hennawi
 6th Prime: "Kattar Kheiry" by Sherine
 7th Prime: "Nawaylak Ala Niya" by Ahlam

References 

1994 births
People from Casablanca
21st-century Moroccan women singers
Living people
Contestants from Arabic singing competitions
Moroccan film actresses
Moroccan television actresses